Feat (stato di natura) is the fourth studio album by Italian singer-songwriter Francesca Michielin, released by RCA Records on 13 March 2020. Following Michielin's participation in the 71st Sanremo Music Festival as part of a duo with Fedez, the album will be re-released on 5 March 2021. The new edition of the album, titled Feat (fuori dagli spazi), will feature new collaborations, including Michielin and Fedez's Sanremo entry "Chiamami per nome", and the song "Cattive stelle", written and performed with Vasco Brondi.

Singles 
"Cheyenne" was released as the lead single from the album on 15 November 2019. The song peaked at number 66 on the Italian Singles Chart. 

On 13 February 2020, Michielin announced that the album's release would be anticipated by three concerts, each with a different location, theme and arrangement, to take place on 20 February, 27 February and 5 March 2020 in Milan. A new song from Feat (stato di natura) was premiered at each concert and released the following day. The first concert took place at the Rocket nightclub, with a vintage electro theme and the premiere of the song "Gange", featuring the Italian rapper Shiva. "Gange" was released on the following day, 21 February. The song peaked at number 61 on the Italian Singles Chart, becoming the album's highest peaking track. The second concert was planned to take place at the Serraglio nightclub, with an urban orchestral theme and the premiere of the song "Riserva naturale", featuring Italian duo Coma Cose. On 24 February, the event was cancelled in accordance with measures intended to prevent the spread of the coronavirus in Lombardy, with Michielin later announcing that the concert would be live-streamed on Facebook instead. The third concert was broadcast on RaiPlay on 5 March 2020 and included the live debut of the song "Monolocale" featuring Fabri Fibra.

The album's title track "Stato di natura" was released as the second single from the album on 13 March 2020, peaking at number 99 on the Italian Singles Chart. On 3 April 2020, "Monolocale" was sent to Italian radios as the album's third single.

Track listing 

Notes
All track titles stylized in all caps.

Charts

Certifications

References

2020 albums
Francesca Michielin albums
RCA Records albums
Vocal duet albums